Luverne or Lu Verne is the name of several places in the United States:
Luverne, Alabama
Luverne, Minnesota
Luverne, North Dakota
Luverne Township, Minnesota
Lu Verne, Iowa

See also
 Luverne (automobile), an early automobile manufacturer
 Luverne Wise (1922–1982), first female American football player